The Initiative of the Republic of Poland, often shortened to Initiative RP and IRP, was a short-lived centre-left agrarian Polish political party.

In April 2004, Zbigniew Łuczak, the leader of the Łódź Self-Defence of the Republic of Poland party, along with several colleagues left the party and created a new party.

The party had two members of parliament in the Sejm; Waldemar Borczyk and Zbigniew Dziewulski. 

On 11 November 2010 the party was de-registered.

References

2004 establishments in Poland
2010 disestablishments in Poland
Agrarian parties in Poland
Agrarian socialism
Centre-left parties in Europe
Defunct agrarian political parties
Defunct socialist parties in Poland
Political parties disestablished in 2010
Political parties established in 2004